Lamine Ba may refer to:

 Lamine Bá (footballer, born 1994), Bissau-Guinean footballer
 Lamine Ba (footballer, born 1997), French-born Mauritanian footballer